Football in Algeria (soccer) is the country's most popular sport. The country's top domestic league is organised into two national divisions, the Algerian Ligue Professionnelle 1 and the Algerian Ligue Professionnelle 2, overseen by the Algerian Football Federation.

History

Beginning
On 5 February 1894, during the French occupation of Algeria era, the first Algerian club was formed in Oran. Club des Joyeusetés d'Oran, was founded by European settlers in the neighborhood El-Derb of Oran. It was followed in the same year by the Club Athlétique Liberté d'Oran (CAL Oran), formed in 1897 by European settlers in the neighborhood Saint-Antoine of Oran under the name Club Athlétique d'Oran. These are the first clubs in the country and the Maghreb. Other clubs will follow later, and will be created in various cities including Oran.

In 1898 was created the first Muslim club, CS Constantine was born in Constantine under the name of IKBAL Emancipation.

In 1911 the French Football Federation creates a North African Championship representing the third French division (honor league), which became an official competition in 1921 after creation in 1920 of the three regional leagues in Oran, Algiers and Constantine, the winner of each league qualify to a North African Championship.

After independence
The Algerian Football Federation was founded in 1963 in order to organise national competitions and international matches. The first national championship and the cup started immediately after independence in 1962.

Club football

List of football clubs in Algeria by major honours won

Before independence period (French Algeria)
Below is a list of football clubs in Algeria before independence. It contains all clubs that have played in different French Algerian leagues divisions before 1962, the independence year of Algeria. Most of the clubs that were founded by the European settlers were dissolved in 1962.

After independence period (Algeria)

National teams

FLN team

In 1958, a representative selection of Algeria's National Team (FLN football team) is secretly created by the National Liberation Front (FLN) to serve the cause of Algeria. it is composed essentially of professional players who play in the French league such Rachid Mekhloufi. The team played its first international  game in a group test before its creation in 1957 in Tunis against Tunisia. Its played several friendly matches with high level national teams and clubs.

Algeria national team

After independence in 1962, Algeria's national team replace the FLN football team. This team saw its period of greatest success in the 1980s with great players such Lakhdar Belloumi, Rabah Madjer, Salah Assad. Algeria qualified for the FIFA World Cup in 1982 and 1986, 2010 and 2014 and qualified to second round in 2014 World Cup after defeating 4-2 South Korea and 1-1 drawing with Russia. The team was eliminated by Germany, crowned as champions by a 2–1 score at extra time.

During the 1982 tournament, Algeria managed a surprise defeat of West Germany in their first ever World Cup game and thus became the first African team to defeat European opposition at the World Cup, but were eliminated after the so-called "Shame of Gijón".

Due to Algeria's historic ties with France, there have been a number of Algerian players playing professionally in the French leagues, while the France national team has included players of Algerian heritage, most notably Zinedine Zidane, Karim Benzema and Samir Nasri.

Future for the Algerians Program

Clubs

References

External links
 FAF official website
 LFP official website

 

bg:Алжирско първенство